"Millions" is a song by American hip hop recording artist Pusha T, which was originally released as a promotional single for his then-upcoming album My Name Is My Name, on January 29, 2013. It was later revealed that the song would not be featured on the album. It was also included on his 2013 mixtape Wrath of Caine. The song, which features a guest appearance from fellow American rapper Rick Ross, peaked at number 47 on the Billboard Hot R&B/Hip-Hop Songs chart.

Music video
The music video for "Millions" was directed by Samuel Rogers, and filmed during late January 2013. On January 24, Def Jam released a trailer for the music video. The full video was released on February 11, 2013. It was described as "massively cliched, full of drug-dealer iconography: Guns, expensive cars, beautiful but duplicitous girls, and police raids" by Stereogum, but explained that it worked due to the charisma of both rappers.

Charts

Release history

References

2012 songs
2013 singles
Pusha T songs
Rick Ross songs
GOOD Music singles
Def Jam Recordings singles
Song recordings produced by Kanye West
Songs written by Rick Ross
Songs written by Pusha T